
Bolesławiec County is a unit of territorial administration and local government (powiat) in Lower Silesian Voivodeship, southwestern Poland. It came into being on January 1, 1999, as a result of the Polish local government reforms passed in 1998. Its administrative seat is the town of Bolesławiec, famed for its pottery, and its only other town is Nowogrodziec.

As at 2019 the total population of the county is 90,108, of which the population of Bolesławiec is 38,852, that of Nowogrodziec is 4,243, and the rural population is 47,013.

Neighbouring counties
Bolesławiec County is bordered by Żagań County to the north, Polkowice County to the north-east, Legnica County and Złotoryja County to the east, Lwówek Śląski County to the south, Lubań County to the south-west, and Zgorzelec County to the west.

Administrative division
The county is subdivided into six gminas (one urban, one urban-rural and four rural). These are listed in the following table, in descending order of population.

Population

Cities

Gminas

References

 
Land counties of Lower Silesian Voivodeship